The 3rd Nuestra Belleza México pageant, was held at the Centro de Convenciones of Cancún, Quintana Roo, Mexico on September 22, 1996. Thirty-two contestants of the Mexican Republic competed for the national title, which was won by Rebeca Tamez from Tamaulipas, who later competed at Miss Universe 1997 in the US. Tamez was crowned by outgoing Nuestra Belleza México] titleholder Vanessa Guzmán and Miss Universe 1996 Alicia Machado from Venezuela. She was the first Tamaulipeca and winner of foreign descent (her mother is an American) to win this title.

The Nuestra Belleza Mundo México title was won by Yessica Salazar from Jalisco, who later competed at Miss World 1996 in India where she was a Semi-finalist in the Top 10. Salazar was crowned by outgoing Nuestra Belleza Mundo México titleholder Alejandra Quintero. She is the first and only Jalisciense to win this title.

For the first time, two events were held separately to select the two winners for the titles Nuestra Belleza México and Nuestra Belleza Mundo México.

Results

Nuestra Belleza México

Nuestra Belleza Mundo México
One week before the Final Competition was held the Preliminary Competition with a live show entitled  "Nuestra Belleza México: Rumbo a Miss Mundo" in which was announced the winner of the Nuestra Belleza Mundo México title Yessica Salazar from Jalisco who represented the country at Miss World 1996 finished as a Semi-finalist in the Top 10. All contestants competed in swimsuit and evening gown during the contest.

The Nuestra Belleza Mundo México pageant was held at the Xcaret Park in Cancún, Quintana Roo, Mexico and was hosted by Marco Antonio Regil. It was the 1st edition of the "Nuestra Belleza Mundo México" contest and as an official separate pageant to choose Mexico's representative to Miss World. Although the Winner of this event also competed in the Final Competition, but finished only as a semi-finalist.

The musical part was enlivened by groups: Manuel Mijares, José Luis Rodríguez "El Puma and Paul Anka.

Contestants

Judges

Preliminary competition
 Miriam Sommers – Fashion and Designer Coordinator
 Víctor Bucardo – Ponds Brand Director
 Glenda Reyna – Glenda Models Director
 César Évora – Actor
 Sarah Bustani – Fashion Designer
 Oscar Madrazo – Contempo Models Director
 Leticia Calderón – Actress

References

External links
 Official Website

.México
1996 in Mexico
1996 beauty pageants